Njang Mengu Collins (born 18 November 1992), known professionally as Ko-c, is a Cameroonian rapper, singer and songwriter.

Biography 
He began his music career by writing songs and sending them to his friends for feedback. He wrote his first song "Town Player" at the age of 20 and began music professionally in the year 2015 when he joined the group of five known as "PIM Boys" (Preach It Movement). 

In July 2015, the group of five signed to BTS Empire a US based music label operated by Valo Valery. In March 2016, the group released its first song "Ici Au Kamer" but parted ways the same year. In November 2016, Ko-c caught the attention of the label Rawget Music and released his first single "Balancé" as a solo artiste.  

In 2017, Ko-c signed with Big Dreams Entertainment and rose to prominence the following year after releasing "Balance Remix" featuring Tenor. He spent three successful years with Big Dreams Entertainment and in the year 2020 he decided to go solo again by creating his own label Power House Entertainment.

Musical Career

2014 - 2021 Early Life and Career Beginnings 
Ko-c was born Njang Mengu Collins on November 18 1994 in Kumba, Cameroon. Ko-c hails from Bafut, in the Northwest region of Cameroon. He attended Victory Nursery and Primary School Mbonge. He attended Government Bilingual High School, Kumba and later enrolled at CCAST Kumba where he obtained his GCE Advanced Level. In 2014, he gained admission at the Higher Institute of Management Studies (HIMS), Buea where he obtained his Bachelors Degree in Management. 

Ko-c started off as a rapper and his unique skills to rap fast on beats earned him the appellation "Cameroon's Fastest Rapper". Ko-c began his music career by writing songs and sending them to his friends for review. He wrote his first song "Town Player" at the age of 20. Ko-c began doing music professionally in 2015. He was one of the fastest rappers in the group of five. They managed to release a single in the year 2016 but parted ways that same year. In 2017, Ko-c caught the attention of the label Rawget Music. The label released his debut single as a solo artiste titled Balancé produced by DeeCy. Things didn't go well with both parties and the rapper went back solo. Ko-c recorded a lot of freestyles and shared them on social media. He later caught the attention of Big Dreams Entertainment founder Gervais Ngongang. 

In January 2017, Ko-c signed a 3 year contract with Big Dreams Entertainment and literally saw his career gaining grounds in the music industry. His first single "I Love You" featuring label mate Locko was the song that marked the beginning of greater things in his career.

Discography

Selected Singles 

 "I Love You" (featuring Locko ) (2017)
 "Laisse Moi Passer" (2017)
 "Bollo C'est Bollo" (2017)
 "Caro" (2018)
 "Balance Remix" (featuring Tenor) (2018)
 "Sango" (featuring Fanicko) (2018)
 "Ça a Cuit" (2019)
 "On S'en Fout" (featuring Ariel Sheney) (2019)
 "Alright" (2020)
 "Mon Pala Pala" (2020)
 "President du Rap-publique" (2020)
 "Ghana Must Go" (featuring Cleo Grae, Banye, Kikoh and Kking Kum) (2020)
 "Caleçon" (featuring Coco Argentee) (2020)
 "Chill" (2021)
 "La Galere" (2021)

Awards and nominations

See also 

 List of Cameroonian Artists

References 

Living people
People from Bamenda
Cameroonian rappers
1992 births